Náchod is a town in the Hradec Králové Region of the Czech Republic. It has about 19,000 inhabitants. It is known both as a tourist destination and centre of industry. The town centre with the castle complex is well preserved and is protected by law as an urban monument zone.

Administrative parts

Town parts and villages of Babí, Běloves, Bražec, Dobrošov, Jizbice, Lipí, Malé Poříčí, Pavlišov and Staré Město nad Metují are administrative parts of Náchod.

Geography
It lies in the northern tip of the Podorlická Uplands. The town is situated in the valley of the river Metuje. There are two ponds in the northwestern part of the territory, Podborný and Odkaliště.

History

The predecessor of Náchod was a settlement called Branka (meaning "Gate") near the land gate, located in the area today known as Staré Město ("Old Town") with the Church of Saint John the Baptist from the 13th century. Knight Hron of Načeradec founded a castle and then a town below the castle in the mid-13th century to protect the territory through which an old trade route from Prague to Kłodzko Land passed. The first written mention of Náchod is from 1254. The town was fortified with walls and bastions in the early 14th century.

Owners of the castle included kings John of Bohemia and George of Poděbrady. During the Hussite Wars, Náchod was conquered and owned by the Hussites. Over time the castle grew into a large fortress. Powerful and rich Smiřický family acquired the domain in 1544 and had the castle rebuilt into a comfortable Renaissance château; the town also flourished at the time, and was endowed with privileges almost equal to royal towns.

The Thirty Years' War put an end to the prosperity of the town. The properties of the Smiřický family, who had been loyal to King Frederick V, were seized by the imperial treasury after the Battle of the White Mountain and sold to the House of Trčka of Lípa in 1623. When Adam Erdman Trčka was assassinated together with his brother-in-law Albrecht von Wallenstein in Cheb in 1634, the domain was seized again and donated by the Emperor to his general Ottavio Piccolomini, later Duke of Amalfi. Thus the town fell into the hands of an Italian family, suffered from military operations and forced re-catholicization, but also enjoyed some development: the château was grandly rebuilt in the Baroque style and the first street in the town was paved in 1638. After the fire of 1663, a new town hall was built and the Church of St. Lawrence on the square was rebuilt. The burgesses were also granted some privileges.

The Piccolominis extinct in 1783, the Náchod domain was inherited by the Desfours family and sold in 1792 to Duke Peter von Biron of Courland  and Sagan, who established a theatre on the castle and significantly improved overall the level of cultural life in Náchod.

When the duke died in 1800, his eldest daughter Katharina Wilhelmine (1781–1839) inherited Náchod and the Duchy of Sagan. After her death, the princes of Schaumburg-Lippe (in today's Lower Saxony) bought Náchod and held the castle till 1945, though the domain system was abolished in the reform of 1849 and succeeded by public administration districts.

Beside the district administration and district court, the reform brought about an elected town council, fast development of industry and schools, and a building boom that included the Neo-Renaissance town hall and Art Nouveau theatre. The railway was also built and from 1882, when two factories were established, the textile industry quickly developed. Náchod became the cotton industry centre of Austria-Hungary and at the beginning of the 20th century, Náchod was nicknamed "Manchester of the east".

Extensive border fortifications were built in and around Náchod in the years prior to World War II to protect the territory of Czechoslovakia against the threat of German invasion. The border in the area of Náchod did not shift after the Munich Agreement, as no German speakers lived next to the border; on the contrary, eleven villages on the Silesian side of the border were populated by Czech speakers, who lived there till 1945 when eastern parts of Germany were ceded to Poland and former German citizens were expelled, ethnic Czechs included.

As Náchod had virtually no ethnic German population, it did not suffer from the massive deportations of 1945–46. It became a somewhat peripheral town during the Communist era (1948–89) as cross-border contacts in the Soviet-dominated bloc were not encouraged. The situation changed in the 1990s and especially when both Czech Republic and Poland became part of the Schengen area in 2007.

Demographics

Economy
The service sector is the major employer in Náchod. The largest employer based in the town is the hospital. Revenues from tourism are crucial for the economy of the town and the whole region.

The largest industrial employers is ATAS elektromotory Náchod a.s. and Ametek elektromotory s.r.o., both producers of electric motors, and the rubber factory Rubena Náchod.

The tradition of textile industry is held by the last surviving cotton-weaving mill BARTOŇ – textil a.s., founded in 1867. Long tradition has also the Primátor Brewery, founded in 1872.

Transport
Náchod lies on the railway line of regional importance from Hradec Králové to Broumov. The town is served by three stations and stops.

There is the road border crossing Náchod / Kudowa Słone.

Sights

Náchod Castle
Náchod Castle is the main landmark of the town. Since 1945, the castle is owned by the state. The interiors are open to the public, its exhibits include collections from Prince Ottavio Piccolomini's time (e.g. tapestries) or phaleristic and numismatic collections. Other sights include Gothic cellars and the observation tower (keep), and a moat with bears, which is the largest bear enclosure in the country.

Ecclesiastical buildings
The Church of Saint Lawrence is located in the middle of Masarykovo Square in the historic town centre. It was first mentioned in 1350 and rebuilt in 1570–1578.

The Church of Saint Michael the Archangel was built in 1709–1716 in the Baroque style.

The Church of Saint John the Baptist in Staré Město nad Metují was built in the Gothic style in the 13th century and reconstructed in the 16th, 17th and 18th centuries. Since 1791, it is only a cemetery church.

Spa
The village of Běloves was known for its spa. The first mention of the healing water is from 1392. The spa was founded in 1818 and closed in 1996. Although the spa complex is in a desolate state, a small colonnade with two mineral springs and permanent exhibition on the history of spa was built by the town and opened in December 2019.

Notable people

Jan Letzel (1880–1925), architect
Jan Roth (1899–1972), cinematographer
Václav Černý (1905–1987), literary scholar and writer
Josef Týfa (1913–2007), type designer
Luba Skořepová (1923–2016), actress
Josef Škvorecký (1924–2012), writer
Petr Skrabanek (1940–1994), physician
Josef Tošovský (born 1950), economist and former prime minister
Václav Kotal (born 1952), football player and manager
Libor Michálek (born 1968), economist and politician
Vratislav Lokvenc (born 1973), footballer
Pavel Bělobrádek (born 1976), politician
Martin Štěpánek (born 1977), freediver
Petr Schwarz (born 1991), footballer

Twin towns – sister cities

Náchod is twinned with:

 Bauska, Latvia
 Halberstadt, Germany
 Kudowa-Zdrój, Poland
 Kłodzko, Poland
 Partizánske, Slovakia
 Persan, France
 Tiachiv, Ukraine
 Warrington, England, United Kingdom

Gallery

References

External links

Náchod Castle official website

Cities and towns in the Czech Republic
Populated places in Náchod District
Czech Republic–Poland border crossings